Nuevo Mundo may refer to:
 Nuevo Mundo (Madrid Metro), a light-rail station in Madrid
 Nuevo Mundo (periodical), Spanish magazine published from 1894 to 1933
 Nuevo Mundo (San Jose, California), Spanish weekly newspaper published from 1996 to 2005 in San Jose, California
 Nuevo Mundo (town), a small city in Bolivia
 Nuevo Mundo Dam, a dam in Cuba
 Nuevo Mundo Lake, a lake in Bolivia
 Nuevo Mundo Television, Spanish-language Canadian TV network
 Nuevo Mundo volcano, a volcano in Bolivia